From the Depths of My Soul is an album by American vocalist Marlena Shaw recorded in 1973 and released on the Blue Note label.

Track listing
 "Prelude / I Know I Love Him" (Bodie Chandler, Wade Marcus) - 3:11  
 "Hum This Song" (Carl Davis) - 3:08  
 "But For Now" (Bob Dorough) - 3:48  
 "Easy Evil" (Alan O'Day) - 3:39  
 "The Laughter and the Tears" (Randy Edelman) - 3:05  
 "The Feeling's Good" (Charles Fox, Norman Gimbel) - 3:55  
 "Wildflower" (David Richardson, Doug Edwards) - 4:04  
 "Just Don't Want To Be Lonely" (Bobby Eli, John C. Freeman, Jr., Vinnie Barrett) - 3:41  
 "Waterfall" (Randy Edelman) - 3:45  
 "Say a Good Word" (Marlena Shaw) - 3:04  
 "Time For Me To Go" (Charles Fox, Norman Gimbel) - 3:16
Recorded on May 30 (tracks 4-6, 8, 10 & 11) and May 31 (tracks 1-3, 7 & 9) with overdubbed strings recorded on June 6, 1973.

Personnel
Marlena Shaw - vocals
Eugene Bianco - harp
Derek Smith - piano, electric piano, clavinet
Gene Bertoncini, Cornell Dupree, Carl Lynch, Hugh McCracken - guitar
Ron Carter - double bass
Wilbur Bascomb, Jr. - electric bass
Charles Collins, Herbie Lovelle, Grady Tate - drums
Arthur Jenkins - conga
George Devens, George Jenkins - percussion
Wade Marcus - arranger, conductor
Unidentified horns and strings

References

Blue Note Records albums
Marlena Shaw albums
1973 albums
Albums arranged by Wade Marcus
Albums produced by George Butler (record producer)